The Garden District is a  historic district in Montgomery, Alabama.

Garden District is roughly bounded by Norman Bridge Road, Court Street, Jeff Davis Avenue, and Fairview Avenue. It contains 678 contributing buildings with architecture including the Queen Anne, Classical Revival and American Craftsman styles.  When listed, the district included 678 contributing buildings and 81 non-contributing buildings.  The district was placed on the National Register of Historic Places on September 13, 1984.

Architecture 
It includes work designed by multiple architects, including one or more works by Ralph Adams Cram.  It includes Late 19th and 20th Century Revivals, Late Victorian, and Bungalow, and other architecture.

Examples of architecture within the Garden District:

References 

Historic districts in Montgomery, Alabama
National Register of Historic Places in Montgomery, Alabama
Historic districts on the National Register of Historic Places in Alabama